Crazy Machines is a puzzle computer game created by German studio FAKT Software GmbH. Crazy Machines based many of its ideas on The Incredible Machine series of games. The player is given a set of mechanical components to construct a Rube Goldberg-style or Heath Robinson-style intricate machine to solve a goal and advance to the next puzzle in the game.

An iOS version of the game was released in 2009.

Gameplay
In the game, players build imaginative machines that turn cranks, rotate gears, pull levers, and more to build a unique contraption. The player can solve more than 200 challenging puzzles and experiment with gears, robots, explosives, and more in a virtual lab. The game uses a physics engine to simulate various in-game variables such as air pressure, electricity, gravity, and particle effects.

See also
Crazy Machines 2
The Incredible Machine

References

External links 
 PDF solutions for all officially released experiment packs
 Review in School Library Journal, September 2007.
 Review in Power to Learn.
 Machines is Up to the Challenge Washington Post, March 2006.

2005 video games
IOS games
MacOS games
Nintendo DS games
Puzzle video games
Video games developed in Germany
Wii games
Windows games
DTP Entertainment games
Single-player video games
Viva Media games
Fakt Software games